The BC107, BC108 and BC109 are general-purpose low power silicon NPN bipolar junction transistors found very often in equipment and electronics books/articles from Europe, Australia and many other countries from the 1960s. They were created by Philips and Mullard in 1963 and introduced in April 1966.  Initially in metal (TO-18) packages, the range expanded over time to include other package types, higher voltage ratings, and a better selection of gain (hFE and hfe) groupings, as well as complementary PNP types. Some manufacturers have specified their parts with a higher power dissipation rating (Ptot) than others.

The BC548 is an example of the modern low-cost member of this family, still in a through-hole package, while the BC848 is the surface-mount version.

Table of BC107 to BC860 variants
{| class="wikitable"
|-
! Case !! Ptot !! Polarity!! ≥ 70 VCBO ≥ 64 VCEO !!  50 VCBO !!  30 VCBO !! Low-Noise (<4 dB)30 VCBO !! Low-Noise (<4 dB)50 VCBO || Notes/Source
|-
|rowspan="2" | TO-18 (C-B-E) ||rowspan="2"| 300 mW|| NPN     ||     BC190  64 VCEO  ||align="top"| BC107 BC107ABC107B 45 VCEO 
|| BC108 BC108ABC108BBC108C 20 VCEO 
 ||   BC109  BC109BBC109C20 VCEO   ||       || Philips Semiconductor Handbook Oct 1966
|-
| PNP                                                  ||        || BC177 45 VCEO || BC178 25 VCEO ||    BC179   25 VCEO    ||   || Philips Application Book: Audio Amplifier Systems, 1971
|-
|rowspan="2" |Lockfit (C-B-E) 

 |rowspan="2"| 250 mW|| NPN     ||        || BC147  45 VCEO|| BC148 20 VCEO ||    BC149   20 VCEO   ||        ||rowspan="2"|    a discontinued plastic case with leads that locks into a PCB's holes.
|-
| PNP     ||        || BC157 45 VCEO || BC158  25 VCEO ||    BC159   20 VCEO   ||                
|-
|rowspan="2" |TO92B (E-C-B)   ||rowspan="2"| 300 mW || NPN     ||        || BC167 45 VCEO || BC168 20 VCEO ||    BC169   20 VCEO   ||  ||               
|-
| PNP     ||        || BC257 45 VCEO || BC258 25 VCEO ||    BC259 20 VCEO     ||              ||  (Also: BC256 64 VCBO)
|-
|rowspan="2" |TO92F (C-B-E)    

|rowspan="2"| 300 mW*|| NPN     ||   BC174  64 VCEO   || BC171  BC237  45 VCEO || BC172  BC238 20 VCEO ||   BC173  BC239   20 VCEO   ||   ||rowspan="2"|  *Fairchild's power rating is 500 mW    Some devices have pre-formed leads with the base bent backwards like a TO-18 pinout (e.g. MEL).        
|-
| PNP     ||        || BC307 45 VCEO || BC308 25 VCEO ||    BC309  20 VCEO    ||               
|-
|rowspan="2" |TO92A (E-B-C) ||rowspan="2"| 310 mW || NPN     ||        || BC317  45 VCEO || BC318   30 VCEO||    BC319   20 VCEO    ||               ||rowspan="2"| Note: 150 mA rating; BC318 VCBO 40 V to 45 V
|-
| PNP     ||        || BC320 45 VCEO || BC321  30 VCEO ||    BC322  20 VCEO  ||                
|-
|rowspan="2" |TO92F (C-B-E)  ||rowspan="2"| 500 mW* || NPN     || BC546 65 VCEO || BC547  45 VCEO  || BC548  30 VCEO||  BC549   30 VCEO   || BC550 45 VCEO  ||rowspan="2"| from Mullard 1977 and Fairchild 2001 specifications; *Some manufacturers specify a 625 mW rating|-
| PNP     ||    BC556  65 VCEO || BC557  45 VCEO || BC558 30 VCEO ||    BC559    30 VCEO  ||    BC560    45 VCEO      
|-
|rowspan="2" | SOT-23 ||rowspan="2"| 150 mW || NPN     || BC846  65 VCEO || BC847  45 VCEO || BC848 30 VCEO  ||    BC849   30 VCEO    || BC850   45 VCEO    ||rowspan="2"|     Surface-mount
|-
| PNP     ||    BC856  65 VCEO || BC857 45 VCEO || BC858 30 VCEO ||  BC859 30 VCEO    ||   BC860  45 VCEO          

|}

(See also:  for a neat summary of some of the family).

Noise figure (at 1 kHz, for a 2 kilohm source, BW = 200 Hz, IC=0.2 mA/VCE=5 V) is <10 dB for those not tabulated as "Low Noise".

Current ratings
All types have a maximum collector current of 100 mA, except that the original Philips tentative data dated 4.4.1966 specified a maximum collector current of 100 mA peak'' (ICM) for the BC107/8/9, and Telefunken originally specified a maximum collector current of 50 mA for the BC109, but since at least 1973 all have revised collector currents of 100 mA average or 200 mA peak, except that the BC317-BC322 range have a 150 mA (continuous) rating.

A,B and C gain groupings
The above devices' type numbers may be followed by a letter "A" to "C" to indicate low to high gain (hFE) groups (see BC548 Gain groupings).

Other characteristics
Transistors in this family:
 require a base-emitter voltage (VBE(on)) in the range of 0.55 to 0.7 volts for a collector current of 2 mA when the Collector voltage is 5 volts.
 Will have a saturation voltage (VCE(sat)) of at most 0.2 volts (typically 0.07 volts) at a collector current of 10 mA and a base current of 0.5 mA (when the base voltage is typically 0.73 volts; 0.83 volts maximum).
 Has greater than unity current gain up to a frequency (fT) of at least 150 MHz, typically 250 MHz, at a collector current of 10 mA (typically 85 MHz and a collector current of 0.5 mA)
 These transistors can be found in the list of suitable TUN transistors ("Transistor Universal Npn") by the [Elektor] magazine for their circuits that require general purpose Silicon transistors meeting certain minimum standards.
 These transistors have PNP complementary types, with only the second digit changed (to a number normally greater than 4) to indicate the reversed polarity, e.g. a BC177 is PNP version of the BC108, and a BC559 is a PNP version of a BC549. 
 Note that this "family" of transistors do not include every transistor with a type number beginning "BC" and ending in "7", "8" or "9". For example the BC328 and BC338 transistors are not included in the Elektor list (and not "family" members), despite sharing some similarities.

See also
 2N2222, 2N2907
 2N3904, 2N3906
 2N3055
 BC548
 KT315

References

Further reading
 BC Transistor Substitution Tables

Historical Databooks
 Small-Signal Transistor Data Book, 1386 pages, 1984, Motorola.
 Transistor and Diode Data Book, 1236 pages, 1973, Texas Instruments.

Commercial transistors
Bipolar transistors